The large moth family Crambidae contains the following genera beginning with "K":

References 

 K
Crambid